Mallosia heinzorum is a species of beetle in the family Cerambycidae. It is endemic to Turkey.

Mallosia heinzorum measure  in length.

References

Saperdini
Beetles of Asia
Endemic fauna of Turkey
Beetles described in 1991